This is a list of confirmed candidates in ballot paper order for the 2022 Australian federal election.

At the close of nominations a total of 1,624 candidates had stood for election, of whom 1,203 were House of Representatives candidates and 421 were Senate candidates.

Retiring members

House of Representatives
Sitting members are listed in bold text. Successful candidates are highlighted in the relevant colour.

Australian Capital Territory

New South Wales

Northern Territory

Queensland

South Australia

Tasmania

Victoria

Western Australia

Senate
In an ordinary half-Senate election, 40 of the 76 Senate seats will be up for election, six (out of twelve) in each state and all four territory seats. Successful candidates are marked with an asterisk from the highlighted list.

Australian Capital Territory
Two seats were up for election. The Labor Party was defending one seat. The Liberal Party was defending one seat.

New South Wales
Six seats were up for election. The Labor Party was defending three seats. The Liberal-National Coalition was defending three seats. Senators Tim Ayres (Labor), Andrew Bragg (Liberal), Perin Davey (National), Mehreen Faruqi (Greens), Hollie Hughes (Liberal) and Tony Sheldon (Labor) were not up for re-election.

Northern Territory
Two seats were up for election. The Labor Party was defending one seat. The Country Liberal Party was defending one seat, although sitting senator Sam McMahon left the party and joined the Liberal Democratic Party.

Queensland
Six seats were up for election. The Labor Party was defending two seats. The Liberal National Party was defending three seats. One Nation was defending one seat. Senators Nita Green (Labor), Susan McDonald (Liberal National), Gerard Rennick (Liberal National), Malcolm Roberts (One Nation), Paul Scarr (Liberal National) and Larissa Waters (Greens) were not up for re-election.

South Australia
Six seats were up for election. The Labor Party was defending two seats. The Liberal Party was defending two seats. The Centre Alliance had two of their seats up for re-election, although sitting senator Rex Patrick left the party and contested instead for the Rex Patrick Team, whilst senator Stirling Griff ran as the second Independent on the Nick Xenophon group ticket. Senators Alex Antic (Liberal), David Fawcett (Liberal), Karen Grogan (Labor), Sarah Hanson-Young (Greens), Anne Ruston (Liberal) and Marielle Smith (Labor) were not up for re-election.

Tasmania
Six seats were up for election. The Labor Party was defending two seats. The Liberal Party was defending three seats. The Greens was defending one seat. Senators Catryna Bilyk (Labor), Carol Brown (Labor), Claire Chandler (Liberal), Richard Colbeck (Liberal), Jacqui Lambie (JLN) and Nick McKim (Greens) were not up for re-election.

Victoria
Six seats were up for election. The Labor Party was defending two seats. The Liberal-National Coalition was defending three seats. The Greens was defending one seat. Senators Raff Ciccone (Labor), Jane Hume (Liberal), James Paterson (Liberal), Janet Rice (Greens), David Van (Liberal) and Jess Walsh (Labor) were not up for re-election.

Western Australia
Six seats were up for election. The Labor Party was defending two seats. The Liberal Party was defending three seats. The Greens was defending one seat. Senators Slade Brockman (Liberal), Pat Dodson (Labor), Matt O'Sullivan (Liberal), Louise Pratt (Labor), Linda Reynolds (Liberal) and Jordon Steele-John (Greens) were not up for re-election.

Disendorsements and resignations
Those with resignation or disendorsement dates before the 21st of April 2022 are not running on the ballot paper under the party they are listed under, but those after that date still made the ballot paper.

Notes

References 

Candidates for Australian federal elections
2022 Australian federal election